Bəhlul Ələmdar oğlu Mustafazadə (born on 27 February 1997) is an Azerbaijani football defender who last played for Qarabağ FK in the Azerbaijan Premier League, and the Azerbaijan national football team.

Career

Club
On 7 February 2017, Mustafazadə joined Sumgayit FK on loan from Gabala FK.

On 26 June 2019, Mustafazadə signed a three-year contract with Sabah.

In the summer of 2021, Mustafazadə left Sabah to sign for Al Ain, however the UAE club subsequently cancelled the transfer, leaving Mustafazadə a free agent.

On 29 July 2021, Qarabağ announced the signing of Mustafazadə to a three-year contract.

International
Mustafazadə made his debut for Azerbaijan on 6 September 2019 in their UEFA Euro 2020 qualifying match against Wales.

Career statistics

Club

International

Statistics accurate as of match played 19 November 2019

Honours
Gabala
 Azerbaijan Cup (1) 2018–19

Qarabağ

 Azerbaijan Premier League (1): 2021-22

References

External links
 
 

1997 births
Living people
Association football defenders
Azerbaijani footballers
Azerbaijan international footballers
Azerbaijan under-21 international footballers
Azerbaijan youth international footballers
Gabala FC players
Sumgayit FK players
Sabah FC (Azerbaijan) players
Azerbaijan Premier League players